Bob Paris (born Robert Clark Paris on December 14, 1959) is an American writer, actor, public speaker, civil rights activist, and former professional bodybuilder. Paris was the 1983 NPC American National and IFBB World Bodybuilding Champion.

Biography

Early life
Paris was born and grew up in Brown County and Columbus, Indiana. From a very early age, he was both artistic and athletic. He won National Scholastic awards for his drawings and paintings and wrote short stories in his spare time. Moreover, Paris was also involved in his school's debate team and a member of the International Thespian Society. Paris was involved in many sports in high school, he did track and field, golf, and was a talented football player for his school. After experimenting with weight training as a Sophomore, Paris started to gain size and strength. From that discovery Paris knew he wanted to be a bodybuilder.

He moved to southern California to pursue his life and dreams of becoming a bodybuilder and actor. Within two years he had won two competitions, Mr. Los Angeles and Mr. Southern California.

Career
In 2006, Flex Magazine ranked Bob Paris the most aesthetic athlete in the history of bodybuilding. Renowned for both his aesthetics and artistic approach toward the sport, he was also a dedicated advocate for the rights of athletes and an outspoken voice in the push for drug testing at the professional level. He retired from bodybuilding in 1991.

In addition to his writing career, Bob Paris remains a civil rights advocate and public speaker. He is also a model and a classically trained theater actor. Since rising to fame in the early 1980s, Bob Paris has appeared on the covers of scores of magazines worldwide.

On October 10, 1998, he made his New York stage debut, starring at Carnegie Hall opposite Bea Arthur, Sandy Duncan, Michael Jeter, Philip Bosco, Alice Ripley and Tyne Daly in the Broadway musical Jubilee as the character Mowgli.

In 2009, he performed in a recurring role on the first season of the ABC Television series, Defying Gravity.

Personal life

In the July 1989 issue of Ironman, Paris came out in the media as a gay man. He was the world's first male professional athlete, in any sport, to come out in the media while still an active competitor in his sport.

The same year, Paris appeared on The Oprah Winfrey Show discussing marriage and being gay. Oprah asked Paris, "Bob, why not just stay in the closet?" Paris explained how "you fall in love" and that it doesn't feel right to hide it. Paris and his former boyfriend, Rod Jackson, became symbols for gay marriage and advocated gay rights. Paris's career ended up suffering because he came out as gay; he claims his life was even threatened through mail and by phone. Paris lost about 80% of his bookings and endorsements for bodybuilding.

After seven years of being together, Paris and Jackson split up. Paris admits that he kept trying to keep his relationship going even when he knew better; Paris felt that he would be giving gays a bad image if he and Jackson broke up.

In 2012, Paris explained on his website that he never wanted to be a "lifestyle bodybuilder." Paris enjoyed the discipline and focus bodybuilding engendered; he also simply just excelled at the sport. To Paris, bodybuilding allowed him to be artistic and a jock all at once, and the sport allowed him to exert his physical presence to the world in a way that demonstrated that he was a man. Today Paris is still active in fitness but not as serious as he once was. Paris believes exercise is part of having a more fulfilling life. Paris saw himself more as a writer over anything else. However, Paris believes bodybuilding saved his life and structured him to be the man he is today.

Today, Paris no longer body-builds, although he lives a more basic natural and spiritual lifestyle and often describes this through his writings on Instagram and other social medial outlets. Paris lives with his spouse, Brian LeFurgey, on an island near Vancouver, British Columbia. Paris holds dual American and Canadian citizenship. Together since 1996, Bob and Brian were legally married in British Columbia after the province equalized the marriage laws in 2003.

Books by Bob Paris
 Beyond Built: Bob Paris' Guide to Achieving the Ultimate Look (1990)
 Flawless: The 10-Week Total Image Method for Transforming Your Physique (1993)
 Natural Fitness
 Straight From The Heart (as co-author)
 Gorilla Suit (1997)
 Generation Queer: A Gay Man's Quest For Hope, Love & Justice
 Prime: The Complete Guide to Being Fit, Looking Good, Feeling Great (2002)

Photography books of Bob Paris
 Duo by Herb Ritts
 Bob & Rod by Tom Bianchi

Bodybuilding career
As an amateur:

1981 NPC Mr. Los Angeles, (Los Angeles, California), Light-heavyweight class and Overall: 1st
1982 NPC Mr. Southern California (Pasadena, California), Light-heavyweight class and Overall: 1st
1982 NPC California Muscle Classic (Pasadena, California), Light-heavyweight class and Overall: 1st
1982 NPC Mr. California (San Jose, California), Light-heavyweight class: 2nd
1982 NPC American National Championships [Mr. America] (New York City), Heavyweight class: 3rd
1983 NPC National Championships [Mr. America] (San Jose, California), Heavyweight class and Overall: 1st
1983 IFBB World Championships [Mr. Universe and professional qualifier] (Singapore), Heavyweight class and Overall: 1st

As a professional:	

IFBB Mr. Olympia:
1984 (New York City): 7th
1985 (Brussels, Belgium): 9th
1988 (Los Angeles, California): 10th
1989 (Rimini, Italy): 14th
1991 (Orlando, Florida):  12th

Additional professional competition highlights:

1988 IFBB Niagara Falls Grand Prix (Niagara Falls, New York): 3rd
1988 IFBB Night of Champions (New York City): 3rd
1988 IFBB Spanish Grand Prix (Madrid, Spain): 4th
1988 IFBB Italian Grand Prix (Bergamo, Italy): 3rd
1989 IFBB Arnold Schwarzenegger Classic (Columbus, Ohio): 5th
1989 IFBB World Professional Championship (Surfers Paradise, Australia): 3rd
1991 IFBB Montreal Grand Prix (Montreal, Quebec): 3rd
	
(NPC = National Physique Committee / IFBB = International Federation of BodyBuilders)

References

1959 births
American bodybuilders
American health and wellness writers
Male models from Indiana
Canadian male models
American motivational speakers
American memoirists
Canadian memoirists
American emigrants to Canada
American male musical theatre actors
Canadian male musical theatre actors
American male stage actors
Canadian male stage actors
American male television actors
Canadian male television actors
Canadian gay actors
Gay sportsmen
Gay memoirists
American LGBT rights activists
Canadian LGBT rights activists
Living people
American LGBT sportspeople
Canadian LGBT sportspeople
People from Columbus, Indiana
Professional bodybuilders
Strength training writers
LGBT people from Indiana
American sportsmen
LGBT bodybuilders
21st-century Canadian LGBT people
American gay writers
Canadian gay writers